Horticulture Export Development Foundation (Hortex Foundation) is a government foundation under the Ministry of Agriculture. The head office of Hortex Foundation is in Dhaka, Bangladesh. 

The Hortex Foundation works to develop and promote agribusiness, including high value agricultural products for export through technical and advisory support to increase the national economy of Bangladesh and farmers' income.

Activities
The Hortex Foundation organizes various seminars to increase the export of agricultural products. On 10th November 2020, the Hortex Foundation organized a seminar on 'Consultation Workshop on Modern Pack House Facilities and Accredited Laboratory Construction' in the auditorium of Bangladesh Agricultural Research Council. The seminar was attended by experts from various universities, research institutes, Researcher, Fruit and Vegetable Exporters Association, Value Chain Expert, Laboratory Expert / Scientists.

References

বহিঃসংযোগ 
 Official website of the Hortex Foundation

1993 establishments in Bangladesh
Government-owned companies of Bangladesh